Brachinus pectoralis is a species of ground beetle in the Brachininae subfamily that is endemic to Crimea.

References

Beetles described in 1825
Endemic fauna of Crimea
Beetles of Europe
Brachininae